P. leucoptera may refer to:
 Peropteryx leucoptera, the white-winged dog-like bat, a bat species
 Piranga leucoptera, the white-winged tanager, a medium-sized American songbird species
 Prosobonia leucoptera, the Tahitian sandpiper, an extinct wader species endemic to Tahiti in French Polynesia
 Psophia leucoptera, the pale-winged trumpeter
 Pterodroma leucoptera, the Gould's petrel, a seabird species
 Pyriglena leucoptera, the white-shouldered fire-eye, a bird species

See also
 Leucoptera (disambiguation)